Ronen Palan (born 21 March 1957) is an Israeli-born economist and Professor of International Political Economy in the Department of International Politics at the City University London. He has many books and articles on the political economy of the state, globalisation and state strategies, and evolutionary approaches to the study of international relations. Ronen Palan was of the founding editors of the Review of International Political Economy. Palan's major empirical work is the area of offshore financial centres and tax havens. Palan has argued that offshore finance "is certainly not the sole cause for the decline of the nation-state, but it must be seen as an important contributing factor to the decline".

In January 2016, Palan acted as an advisor to the BBC's documentary, Britain’s Trillion Pound Paradise – Inside Cayman. In May 2017, Palan also featured in the documentary, "The Spider's Web: Britain's Second Empire" on the U.K.'s relationships with tax havens.

As a student, Palan attended the London School of Economics, where he produced his PhD thesis Patterns of non-governmental interactions as a bridge between the structuralist theory of the state and the study of international relations. He subsequently worked at Newcastle University and the University of Sussex before joining Birmingham University in 2007. Palan has authored and edited a number of books, including Global Political Economy: Contemporary Theories (edited, Routledge, 2000), The Offshore World: Sovereign Markets, Virtual Places, and Nomad Millionaires (Cornell University Press, 2003), The Imagined Economies of Globalisation (with Angus Cameron, Sage, 2004) and Tax Havens: How Globalization Really Works (with Richard Murphy, Christian Chavagneux, Cornell University Press, 2010).

Palan is married and has two sons.

Books

References

Academics of City, University of London
Israeli political scientists
Living people
1957 births